James Richard Condon Sr. (August 6, 1897 –  September 8, 1945), known as Jimmy and Jimmie, was an American college football, college basketball, and college baseball player and coach and later a physician. He played football, basketball, and baseball at Gonzaga University in Spokane, Washington and served as volunteer coach in all three sports during the 1917–18 academic year. After graduating from Gonzaga in 1918, Condon moved on to Creighton University in Omaha, Nebraska, where he studied medicine and played football as a fullback under head coach Tommy Mills from 1918 to 1920.

Condon attended Gonzaga High School—now known as Gonzaga Preparatory School—in Spokane, graduating in 1914. He received a medical degree from Creighton in 1923 and returned to Spokane in 1925 to begin a medical practice. Condon died of a heart attack on September 8, 1945, at his home in Spokane.

References

External links
 

1897 births
1945 deaths
20th-century American physicians
American football fullbacks
American football halfbacks
Forwards (basketball)
Player-coaches
Creighton Bluejays football players
Gonzaga Bulldogs baseball coaches
Gonzaga Bulldogs baseball players
Gonzaga Bulldogs football coaches
Gonzaga Bulldogs football players
Gonzaga Bulldogs men's basketball coaches
Gonzaga Bulldogs men's basketball players
Gonzaga Preparatory School alumni
Coaches of American football from Washington (state)
Players of American football from Spokane, Washington
Baseball coaches from Washington (state)
Baseball players from Spokane, Washington
Basketball coaches from Washington (state)
Basketball players from Spokane, Washington
Physicians from Washington (state)